Versova Assembly constituency is one of the 288 Vidhan Sabha (legislative assembly) constituencies in Maharashtra state in western India.

Overview
Versova (constituency number 164) is one of the 26 Vidhan Sabha constituencies located in the Mumbai Suburban district. The number of electors in 2009 was 251,940 (male 138,805, female 113,135).

Versova is part of the Mumbai North West Lok Sabha constituency along with five other Vidhan Sabha segments, namely Dindoshi, Goregaon, Jogeshwari East, Andheri East and Andheri West in the Mumbai Suburban district.

Members of Legislative Assembly

Election results

Assembly Elections 2019

Assembly Elections 2014

Assembly Elections 2009

See also
 Versova (disambiguation)
 List of constituencies of Maharashtra Vidhan Sabha

References

Assembly constituencies of Mumbai
Politics of Mumbai Suburban district
Assembly constituencies of Maharashtra